The 1910 Oregon gubernatorial election took place on November 8, 1910 to elect the governor of the U.S. state of Oregon. The election matched incumbent Republican Jay Bowerman against Democratic challenger Oswald West. In the election, approximately 118,442 ballots were cast.

After the resignations of George Chamberlain (to take up a Senate seat) and Frank W. Benson (due to illness), then President of the Oregon Senate Jay Bowerman took up the role as Governor for the remainder of the term. Bowerman sought election as governor in his own right on a platform advocating modernization of highways, economies in government administration, and tight control of state land management.

Oswald West, a former agent of State Land Board and then member of the Oregon Railroad Commission, won the Democratic primary on the back of his good reputation on both offices. As an agent of the State Land Board, he helped recover thousands of acres that had been fraudulently obtained with the help of corrupt officials. As an agent of the Railroad Commission, he was popular and had enough public clout to win his party's nomination.

Despite Oregon being a mostly Republican state at the time, Bowerman was defeated by his Democratic opponent after being labeled an opponent of direct government. Bowerman was nominated by the Republican Party in assembly despite the fact that Oregonians had adopted a direct primary law prohibiting party nominating conventions.

Two minor candidates, a Socialist and Prohibitionist, took about twelve percent of the vote between themselves.

Results

References

Gubernatorial
1910
Oregon
November 1910 events